Mey  is a remote village, located on the north coast of Scotland in Caithness, Scottish Highlands and is in the Scottish council area of Highland.

There is also a hotel run in the former coaching inn.

References

Populated places in Caithness